The John Tonge Centre is the mortuary for Queensland Health Forensic and Scientific Services (FSS - formerly Queensland Health Scientific Services) and responsible for conducting autopsies in Brisbane (and much of South-East Queensland in Australia) on people whose deaths make them subject to the Coroners Act. Such deaths include accidents, suicides, homicides, deaths during surgery and anything for which a doctor is unwilling to issue a medical cause of death certificate for. In cases when the family is called upon to attend the Centre to identify a loved one support services are generally available. Staff at the mortuary performs some 2,000 autopsies annually and is adjacent to the Queen Elizabeth II Jubilee Hospital on Kessels Road in Coopers Plains.

History
From 1879 until 1992 the Brisbane morgue occupied five different sites on the north bank of the Brisbane River. The building was flooded in 1887, in the 1890 flood it collapsed into the Brisbane River, then in the 1893 flood it was washed away. It was then reconstructed further downstream at Gardens Point. Finally, in 1992 the morgue moved to a purpose built facility at Coopers Plains. 

The facility was opened officially by the Right Honourable Mr Wayne Goss, Premier of Queensland, on 11 December 1992, and commenced operations on 11 January 1993.

Criticism 
There have been accusations of long delays in DNA testing for criminal cases, and further accusations about poor treatment of the dead. In 2005 an employee of the centre was under investigation regarding stolen body parts, based on written accusations by colleagues from some years before.

A twenty-six million dollar construction operation was undertaken to help rectify the existing problems and the John Tonge Centre now has an annual budget of forty-five million dollars with a resultant reduction in the DNA backlog.

References

External links
Official site of Queensland Health

Buildings and structures in Brisbane
Medical and health organisations based in Australia